The M9 rifle grenade was an American anti-tank rifle grenade used during World War II. It was derived as a lighter version of the M10 grenade which was too heavy to be fired to an effective distance from a rifle. (The M10  evolved into a rocket-propelled munition known as the bazooka.)

Towards the end of the Second World War, its limited effect against heavy German tanks became noticed. This became apparent when US forces engaged T-34 tanks in the Korean War. It was replaced in the anti-tank role by the M28, an American version of the Energa rifle grenade, which was itself replaced several years later by the M31 HEAT rifle grenade.

It was adopted by the British as the No. 85 grenade in 1944, and was similarly superseded by the Energa in British service too during the 1950s. This new munition in the Commonwealth armoury required adapted discharger cartridges, which were made in the UK, Canada, Australia, India and Pakistan.

China adopted a copy of the M9A1 rifle grenade, as Type 64. It was used by North Vietnamese forces during the Vietnam War, being fired from AT-44 grenade launchers fitted on M44 Mosin-Nagant carbines.

Description

References

External links
 U.S. Explosive Ordnance (Vol. 2); Part 4 - Grenades
US Marine Corps Guidebook 1951 - Rifle Grenades

World War II infantry weapons of the United States
Grenades of the United States
Anti-tank grenades
Rifle grenades